Sun Li is a fictional character in Water Margin, one of the four great classical novels of Chinese literature. Nicknamed "Sick Yuchi", he ranks 39th among the 108 Stars of Destiny and third among the 72 Earthly Fiends.

Background
An eight chi tall skilled warrior, Sun Li has a broad face studded with whiskers and jet black eyes. Expert in the use of a variety of weapons, he usually fights with a steel club in one hand and a spear in the other. He is nicknamed "Sick Yuchi"  as he resembles the Tang Dynasty general Yuchi Gong not only in looks but also his specialisation in steel club as a weapon. The term "sick" reflects he has a pale complexion.

A native of Qiongzhou (瓊州; present-day Hainan), Sun Li lives in Dengzhou (登州; in present-day eastern Shandong), where he serves as a garrison officer and his younger brother Sun Xin, nicknamed "Little Yuchi" runs a tavern with his spouse Gu Dasao.

Prison raid in Dengzhou
Gu Dasao is informed by the jailer Yue He of the Dengzhou prison that the hunter brothers Xie Zhen and Xie Bao, who are Gu's cousins, have been jailed and might be sentenced to death. The Xies have smashed up the house of one Squire Mao after failing to find a tiger they shot that had fallen into the old man's garden. In fact, the squire had sent the tiger to the prefecture office for reward. His sister being the wife of Sun Li, Yue He is obligated to protect the Xies. 

Gu Dasao consults with her husband, who invites the outlaws Zou Yuan and Zou Run to help in the rescue. Gu is worried that her brother-in-law Sun Li would stand in their way. So she pretends to be ill and gets Sun Li to visit her. When Sun appears, she threatens him to decide either to join them or fight them. Sun reluctantly signs on to their plan.

Pretending to take food to the Xie brothers, Gu Dasao is let into the prison by Yue He. Yue then unshackles and frees the Xies while Gu causes havoc inside the jail compound. Meanwhile Sun Li launches attack from the outside with the rest. The group pull off the rescue and flee to join the outlaws of Liangshan Marsh.

Battle against the Zhu Family Village
Before going up Liangshan, the group learn that Song Jiang is stuck in a battle with the Zhu Family Village. As Sun Li has been taught combat skill by the same teacher of Luan Tingyu, the village's martial arts instructor, he suggests he can use that link to win the confidence of the Zhus and then topple them from within their ranks. 

Sun Li, taking along Sun Xin, Gu Dasao, Xie Zhen, Xie Bao, Yue He, Zou Yuan and Zou Run, visits the Zhus, telling them he has passed by and feels obliged to help them in their defence against Liangshan.

Although allowed to stay, Sun Li initially does not have the full trust of the Zhus. Only after he pretends to capture Liangshan's Shi Xiu in a feigned one-on-one combat that the Zhus let down their guard. The group embedded among the Zhus go on a bloody rampage when Sun Li sees the opportunity to strike and gives the signal. The manor is thus taken, with the Zhus massacred.

Campaigns and later life
Sun Li is appointed as one of the scouting generals of the Liangshan cavalry after the 108 Stars of Destiny came together in what is called the Grand Assembly. He participates in the campaigns against the Liao invaders and rebel forces in Song territory following amnesty by Emperor Huizong for Liangshan.

Sun Li is among the few heroes who survive all the campaigns. Reinstated as garrison officer in Dengzhou, he goes back to his previous place of service while his brother Sun Xin and sister-in-law Gu Dasao also return there to resume the business of running an inn.

Other appearances
In Iron Arm, Golden Sabre, Sun Li is portrayed to be studying martial arts alongside Zhou Tong and Luan Tingyu. Their teacher is a Shaolin martial artist named Tan Zhengfan. Zhou Tong becomes a drill instructor of the Imperial Guards and uses his influence to get Sun Li the position of garrison major in Dengzhou.

References

 
 
 
 
 
 
 

72 Earthly Fiends
Fictional characters from Hainan